Margent is a vertical arrangement of flowers, leaves or hanging vines used as a decorative ornament in architecture and furniture design in the 16th, 17th and 18th centuries. This motif was developed as a complement to other decorative ornaments, hanging as "drops" at the ends of a festoon or swag. Also used to accentuate the vertical lines of window frames and centered in ornamental panels.

The term margent is an archaic word meaning "margin", a border or edge;  especially handwriting on the edges of a printed book (or marginalia).  Related to the word "marches", the area between two regions.

Shakespeare uses the word in Act II, Scene I of A Midsummer Night's Dream:
These are the forgeries of jealousy
And never, since the middle summer's spring,
Met we on hill, in dale, forest or mead,
By paved fountain or by rushy brook,	 
Or in the beached margent of the sea,	 
To dance our ringlets to the whistling wind,	 
But with thy brawls thou hast disturb'd our sport.
—Titania, the queen of the fairies 	

Beached Margent of the Sea is also the name of a painting by Canadian artist, F.M. Bell-Smith (1846–1923).

See also
 Marginalia

References

 Volume II

Ornaments (architecture)
Types of sculpture
History of furniture
Architectural elements
Visual motifs
Ornaments